Jorge Perry (1908 – 29 December 1946) was a Colombian long-distance runner. He competed in the marathon at the 1932 Summer Olympics.

References

External links
 

1908 births
1946 deaths
Athletes (track and field) at the 1932 Summer Olympics
Colombian male long-distance runners
Colombian male marathon runners
Olympic athletes of Colombia
Sportspeople from Boyacá Department
Road incident deaths in Colombia
Motorcycle road incident deaths
20th-century Colombian people